The cuneiform me sign is a common multi-use sign of the Epic of Gilgamesh, the 1350 BC Amarna letters, and other cuneiform texts. It also has a sumerogrammic usage for ME in the Epic of Gilgamesh.

Because of its extensive syllabic multi-use (in the Epic of Gilgamesh), its grammatical usage would be as follows: all the syllabic usages possible, but for alphabetic usage, as follows; for consonants, it could be used for "m", "s", "š", "b", and "p". (b and p are interchangeable, and s can also be substituted for š, and vice versa for all four). For the vowel e ( or ì, i ), all the four vowels, a, e, i, and u, can also be interchanged in the formation of words.

Epic of Gilgamesh usage
In the Epic of Gilgamesh, Tablets I-XII, "me" is used for the following meanings by the following numbers: me-(98) times, mì-(9), sip-(1), šeb-(3), šep-(1), šib-(12), šip-(2), and ME-(5) times.

See also
 Me (mythology)

References

Moran, William L. 1987, 1992. The Amarna Letters. Johns Hopkins University Press, 1987, 1992. 393 pages.(softcover)
 Parpola, 1971. The Standard Babylonian Epic of Gilgamesh, Parpola, Simo, Neo-Assyrian Text Corpus Project, c 1997, Tablet I thru Tablet XII, Index of Names, Sign List, and Glossary-(pp. 119–145), 165 pages.

Cuneiform signs